'Umar ibn Abi Rabi'ah al-Makhzumi (November 644, Mecca – 712/719, Mecca, full name: Abū ’l-Khattāb Omar Ibn Abd Allah Ibn Abi Rabia Ibn al-Moghaira Ibn Abd Allah Ibn Omar Ibn Makhzūm Ibn Yakaza Ibn Murra al-Makhzūmi) was an Arab poet. He was born into a wealthy family of the Quraysh tribe of Mecca, his father being Abd Allah and his mother Asmā bint Mukharriba. He was characterised by the biographer Ibn Khallikan as 'the best poet ever produced by the tribe of Quraysh'.

He is known for his love poetry and for being one of the originators of the literary form ghazel in Islamic literature. He was "impassioned by everything beautiful that he saw in the street or during pilgrimage.". According to Ibn Khallikan, the most prominent object of his affections was al-Thuraya bint Ali Ibn Abd Allah Ibn al-Harith Ibn Omaiya al-Ashghar Ibn Abd Shams Ibn Abd Manāf, granddaughter of the famous poet Qutayla bint al-Nadr, who married Suhail Ibn Abd al-Rahmān Ibn Auf al-Zuhri, on which occasion Umar recited the following famous verses, which pun on the fact that the married couple's names are both names of heavenly bodies (Suhail being Canopus and al-Thuraiya being the Pleiades): O thou who joinest in marriage ath-Thuraiya and Suhail, tell me, I pray thee, how can they ever meet? The former rises in the north-east, and the latter in the south-east!

References

644 births
710s deaths
Poets from the Umayyad Caliphate
Banu Makhzum
Love in Arabic literature

7th-century Arabs
8th-century Arabs
People from Mecca
7th-century Arabic poets
8th-century Arabic poets